Pavle Radunović (born 26 May 1996) is a Serbian football player.

Club career
He made his Serbian First League debut for FK Sinđelić Beograd on 5 March 2016 in a game against FK Donji Srem.

On 11 June 2018, he signed a one-year deal with the Russian club FC Baltika Kaliningrad. The contract was dissolved by mutual consent on 22 December 2018.

Personal life
His twin brother Boris is also a professional footballer, playing for Cagliari in the Serie A.

References

External links
 

1996 births
Footballers from Belgrade
Twin sportspeople
Serbian twins
Living people
Serbian footballers
Serbian expatriate footballers
FK Sinđelić Beograd players
OFK Beograd players
FC Baltika Kaliningrad players
Serbian First League players
Liga II players
SSU Politehnica Timișoara players
Serbian expatriate sportspeople in Russia
Expatriate footballers in Russia
Serbian expatriate sportspeople in Romania
Expatriate footballers in Romania
Association football wingers